Milan Černý (born 16 March 1988) is a Czech football player who currently plays for Czech club FK Kosoř.

Career 
Černý began his career with Slavia Prague on youth side, he played his first game in the Gambrinus liga on 14 May 2005 against Příbram. In May 2006, his career was halted due to a knee injury.

In July 2011, he signed a contract with Turkish club Sivasspor. He returned to the Czech Republic in September 2013 and signed a one-year deal with Dukla Prague. In June 2014, he signed a contract with his former club Slavia Prague.

International career 
Černý was a member of the Czech under-21 team. He represented the team at the 2011 UEFA European Under-21 Football Championship.

Černý made his debut for the Czech national team as a substitute in the 1-2 friendly loss to Turkey on 22 May 2010. He also scored his first goal in the same match. He made three appearances for the national team in 2010, but none since.

References

External links

1988 births
Living people
Czech footballers
Czech Republic youth international footballers
Czech Republic under-21 international footballers
Czech Republic international footballers
Czech expatriate footballers
SK Slavia Prague players
SK Kladno players
FK Dukla Prague players
FC Hradec Králové players
FC Slavoj Vyšehrad players
Sivasspor footballers
Czech First League players
Czech National Football League players
Süper Lig players
Expatriate footballers in Turkey
Czech expatriate sportspeople in Turkey
Association football midfielders
Footballers from Prague